The Eastern Caribbean Davis Cup team represented member nations of the Organization of Eastern Caribbean States in Davis Cup tennis competition. 

The team represents full members of The Organisation of Eastern Caribbean States (OECS) and associate members whose population does not exceed 200,000.

Eastern Caribbean have not competed since 2004.  They reached the quarterfinals of Group II in 1991.

History
Eastern Caribbean competed in its first Davis Cup in 1991.  Players from member nations previously competed on the Caribbean/West Indies team.

Last team (2004) 

  Dexter Christian
  Corey Huggins
  Hayden Ashton
  Glynn James (Captain-player)

Nations and Territories represented

See also
Davis Cup
Eastern Caribbean Fed Cup team

External links

Davis Cup teams
Tennis in the Caribbean
Organisation of Eastern Caribbean States people